Jaakko Valtanen (born 9 February 1925) is a Finnish general. He is the former Chief of Defence of the Finnish Defence Forces from 1983 to 1990. He was the last Finnish Chief of Defence to have served in the Continuation War. He has been the first guest to greet the President of Finland in the annual Independence Day Receptions since 2016.

References

External links
The Finnish Defence Forces: Chiefs of Defence 

1925 births
Living people
People from Hämeenlinna
Chiefs of Staff (Finnish Defence Forces)
Finnish generals
Finnish military personnel of World War II